Pinoy Adventures is a 2012 Philippine television travel documentary show broadcast by GMA Network. Hosted by Richard Gutierrez, it premiered on May 13, 2012. The show concluded on September 29, 2012 with a total of 21 episodes. It was replaced by Wish Ko Lang! in its timeslot.

The show scours the country to feature some unknown paradise, forgotten relics and cultural treasures and lost traditions that rarely see on television.

Throughout its run, the host was accompanied by some local residents, historians, archaeologists and story tellers also served as tourist guides.

In addition to seeing some of the country's hidden paradise, Gutierrez also tried some extreme sports and tasted different local foods and delicacies. His means of transportation included airplanes, boats, bicycle and foot.

The show's slogan is Huwag magpaiwan! or Don't be left behind! in English.

Episodes

Sibuyan Island, Romblon
(May 13, 20, 27, 2012)
On the premiere episode, the host and the rest of the team explore Sibuyan Island in Romblon. From Aklan to the destination, the team travels 4 hours by boat. The following day, the host explores Magdiwang's Sibuyan forest using mountain bike. On his way, he passes Mount Guiting-Guiting or G2. He also visits Lambingan Falls, a community-based eco-tourism. From Magdiwang, the host visits San Fernando's Ikaduha Fish Sanctuary where he tries snorkeling. The following morning, Gutierrez experienced Sayap or community net fishing, a tradition in San Fernando. After that, he visits Cantingas River.

Linapacan, Palawan
(June 3, 10, 2012)
Linapacan (which means footprints) is part of Calamianes Group of Island. It composed of 10 barangays. The host and the rest of the team visit first Ariara Island. On its second part, Gutierrez visits a century-old fortress called Sitio Caseledan, where he discovers a tribe called Tagbanuas which according to historical data, are already civilized even before the Spanish era. The team also explores Eli island and the Senyora cave, the most beautiful cave in Eli where they discovered the limestone formations inside.

Kalinga
(June 17, 24, 2012)
The show features the ecotourism discovery destination of the north, Kalinga. On his accession to the mountainous Cordillera, the host will experienced a warm welcome from the locals. He visits a panciteria (noodle house) to eat "batil patung", the Tuguegarao version of stir fried noodles mixed with buffalo meat. But before he ate, he was invited by the owner to cook. After the food trip and while they were traveling, the ground suddenly crumbled and covered the road. Fortunately the team met Lakay Appad who offered them fresh pork as offering for Kabunian, the God recognized by the indigenous people. Later on, the team continued the journey. The whole team have witnessed natural beauty: green mountains in which the clouds almost kissed the land, and the rice terraces. Basically, the Kalinga mountains area is home of brave inhabitants. Gutierrez met the "headhunters", and another tribal group whose members have tattoo covered all over their bodies. The host also met the oldest tattoo artist, Wang-od, and its customers who are old ladies in the tribe.

Surigao del Norte
(July 1, 8, 2012)
Beyond the sand, surf and sea, the host, Richard Gutierrez and the rest of the team discover a different kind of adventure in several islands of the province. His first stop, Hikdop Island. An hour away from the city center, the white sandy shores and limestone cliffs lead him, not to the depths of the sea, but to the bosoms of Buenavista Cave. Despite the threat of absolute darkness and venomous snakes, he spends hours hiking the cave with locals who know each step and rock that lead to the magnificent "King's Court" and "King's Throne" rock formations. In Basul island, his next stop is a camping ground. Gutierrez sets up his own tent, makes his own bed and enjoys the rare night-time solitude. The team also discovers a different adventure in the floating village of Day-asan where houses on stilts line waterlogged streets. Gutierrez tries to navigate "abandung", a small boat made with one whole block of  solid hardwood. He caps the trip with a trip to the lobster farm where he gets a sumptuous taste of Surigaonon flavor. The host explores saltwater marine life and even pre-historic looking fishes in Lake Bababu. He also finds a halocline where inland fresh water merges with seawater

Cebu
(July 15, 22, 2012)
Dubbed as "The Queen City of the South", the host, Richard Gutierrez revisited his hometown, Cebu. He takes us on an exploration of the less traveled adventure spots to rediscover the magnificent vistas of the province that he considers his home away from home. A warm welcome at the Rama Compound, the place where his mother's kin have lived for decades, starts off his search for adrenaline-pumping action. He shares a meal of "Bam-I", a type of pancit (noodles) dish that's considered the family heirloom recipe. He also gives a tour of the house as he relives his moments spent vacationing in Cebu. Energized with great memories, Gutierrez and the rest of the team hies off to their first adventure stop: Matutinao River in the town of Badian, a destination only three hours away from the city and frequented by extreme outdoor enthusiasts.
He tries his hand at canyoneering, a sport that involves abseils (rappels) and ropework, technical climbing or down-climbing as well as jumps and swims along canyons and mountain gorges. The arduous physical challenge doesn't stop Richard from admiring the magnificent view and enjoying the company of the local canyoneering group. On the second part episode, the host meets up with the Bugoy Bikers, a group of biking environmentalists founded by Jens Funk, a German national who chose to make Cebu his home 8 years ago. The group endeavours to lessen air pollution by encouraging bike tours around the province, a cause close to Gutierrez's heart. They fuel up with a hearty meal at the start-off point of the tour, "Balay ni Bugoy" (Visayan for Bugoy's House), a bed and breakfast frequented by biking enthusiasts.  The biking tour takes them mostly uphill along the roads of Barangay Gaas in the town of Balamban. The difficult yet scenic tour ends in Cantabaco, another adventure destination for locals and tourists who are into the extreme sport of rock climbing. After that, the whole team makes a quick detour, to give a taste of "danggit", sun-dried rabbit fish, and the famous "best roast pig in the world", according to world-renowned chef, Anthony Bourdain. After the food trip, Gutierrez, finds himself in the Cantabaco Rock Climbing Wall, a group of limestone rock formations discovered in 1983 by local mountaineers.

Bukidnon
(August 4, 2012)
The host, together with his special guest, actress Sarah Lahbati start off by exploring the "Highland Paradise of Mindanao" with a popular mode of transportation in the province, horses! Then they try extreme sport together - the luge. They get to ride a small coasting sled along a steep and winding luge track. They also find themselves in dune buggy. The ride brings them to a high point with a panoramic view of the verdant mountains of Bukdinon. But as the adventure continues, they find out how they will survive when the buggy gets stuck. To cap their extreme Bukidnon adventure, Gutierrez and Lahbati, get tight as they ride the Anicycle, a bicycle ride 100-feet above the ground over a single tightrope.

Sarangani
(August 11, 18, 2012)
Richard Gutierrez and the rest of the team invaded Sarangani province. Here, they accompanied by Sarangani Congressman Manny Pacquiao. In Barangay New La Union, Gutierrez and Pacquiao tried the whitewater river tubing adventure where they negotiated the 1.6-kilometer whitewater river tubing at Pangi River's rapids. On the second part of the series, Gutierrez tried another extreme adventure, night diving (again with Pacquiao) and paragliding which Gutierrez highly recommends for the extreme adventure seekers.

Davao
(August 25, September 1, 2012)
In celebration of Kadayawan Festival, host Richard Gutierrez with his special guest Marian Rivera invaded Davao. wild water adventure in Davao River welcomes them. Braving the rapids was one unique adventure for these two, aside from screaming their lungs out! After that, Gutierrez embarks on a one-of-a-kind adventure as he explored one of the most interesting destinations in Samal Island, the Bito Depression. Stories say this 500 feet deep hole is the result of a fallen meteor. Adrenaline keeps pumping as he rappelled down the cave filled with thousands of bats.

Iloilo
(September 8, 15, 2012)
The program host first visits Jaro Cathedral, which is hailed as one of the oldest churches in the country.  Romanesque-revival architecture constructs this shrine whose bell tower is unusually located across the Jaro Plaza. Iloilo is also known as the home of the famous La Paz batchoy and it catches the host's interest. Aside from trying this Ilonggo favorite, Gutierrez also served this dish to hungry customers. And being the adventurous person that he is, Gutierrez heads to the town of Dingle to pass through century-old trees and trek caves with ancient writings on the walls. But his biggest adventure was to braved the inconspicuous angles of the  Nautod Wall.

Bicol
(September 22, 29, 2012)
He then takes the adrenaline up a notch by riding an All-terrain vehicle going to Mayon Volcano. But Gutierrez's biggest challenge yet is to taste the signature chili dishes of Bicol. On the second part, the host and the rest of the team visited Camarines Sur and visits the beautiful Caramoan Islands to experience wake-boarding and mountain off-road driving.

Ratings
According to AGB Nielsen Philippines' Mega Manila household television ratings, the pilot episode of Pinoy Adventures earned a 19.7% rating. While the final episode scored an 18.2% rating.

Accolades

References

2012 Philippine television series debuts
2012 Philippine television series endings
Filipino-language television shows
GMA Network original programming
GMA Integrated News and Public Affairs shows
Philippine documentary television series
Philippine travel television series